Kulere (also known as Tof, Korom Boye, Akandi, Akande, Kande) is an Afro-Asiatic language spoken in Bokkos, Plateau State, and in some parts of Wamba in Nassarawa State, Nigeria.

Notes

Further reading
A Sociolinguistic Survey of the Kulere Dialects of Plateau and Nassarawa States, Nigeria

West Chadic languages
Languages of Nigeria